The phrase sustainable industries is related to the development of industrial processes in a sustainable way. The phrase refers to greening of energy intensive industries such as the textiles, steel, cement, and paper industries.

History 

The earliest mention of the phrase "sustainable industries" appeared in 1990 in a story about a Japanese group reforesting a tropical forest to help create sustainable industries for the local populace.

Soon after, a study entitled “Jobs in a Sustainable Economy” by Michael Renner of the Worldwatch Institute was published, using the term "sustainable industries". This 1991 report concluded, "Contrary to the jobs-versus-owls rhetoric that blames environmental restrictions for layoffs, the movement toward an environmentally sustainable global economy will create far more jobs than it eliminates. The chief reason: non-polluting, environmentally sustainable industries tend to be intrinsically more labour intensive and less resource intensive than traditional processes."  Among the features of sustainable industry offered in the paper were energy efficiency, resource conservation to meet the needs of future generations, safe and skill-enhancing working conditions, low waste production processes, and the use of safe and environmentally compatible materials. Some of the benefits, however, would be offset by higher prices (due to labor costs) and a theoretically larger population needed to perform the same amount of work, increasing the agricultural and other loads on the system.

In February 2003 the business magazine Sustainable Industries was first published, offering news and analysis of core industries such as clean energy and green building. By 2012 the company had expanded to include digital media and event production with the Sustainable Industries Economic Forum in the U.S. Sustainable Industries merged with Triple Pundit in 2011. Then in 2013 Sustainable Industries stopped publishing under its masthead.

See also

Renewable energy industry

References

Industries (economics)
Sustainable technologies